is a professional Japanese baseball player. He plays pitcher for the Saitama Seibu Lions.

External links

 NPB.com

1988 births
Living people
Baseball people from Shizuoka Prefecture
Japanese baseball players
Nippon Professional Baseball pitchers
Saitama Seibu Lions players